Michael Scannell (born 1949) is an Irish retired Gaelic footballer. His league and championship career with the Cork senior team spanned five seasons from 1969 to 1973.

Born in Ballyvourney, County Cork Scannell first played competitive Gaelic football in his youth. He first appeared for the Naomh Abán club at underage levels, winning a host of divisional minor and under-21 championship medals. Scannell subsequently won county junior championship and county intermediate championship medals. As a member of the Muskerry divisional team, he won a county senior championship medal in 1970.

Scannell made his debut on the inter-county scene when he was selected on the Cork minor team in 1967. He enjoyed one championship season with the minors won an All-Ireland medal as a non-playing substitute in 1967. Scannell subsequently joined the Cork under-21 team, an All-Ireland medal in 1970. By this stage he had also joined the Cork senior team, becoming a member of the extended panel during the 1969 championship. Over the course of the next five seasons, Scannell won one All-Ireland in 1973 as a non playing substitute. He also won two Munster medals. Scannell played his last game for Cork in September 1973.

Scannell lined out with the Munster inter-provincial team for one season in 1972. He won a Railway Cup medal that year.

Honours

Naomh Abán
Cork Intermediate Football Championship (1): 1977
Cork Junior Football Championship (1): 1973

Muskerry
Cork Senior Football Championship (1): 1970

Cork
All-Ireland Senior Football Championship (1): 1973
Munster Senior Football Championship (2): 1971 (c), 1973
All-Ireland Under-21 Football Championship (1): 1970
Munster Under-21 Football Championship (2): 1969, 1970
All-Ireland Minor Football Championship (1): 1967
Munster Minor Football Championship (1): 1967

Munster
Railway Cup (1): 1972

References

1949 births
Living people
Naomh Abán Gaelic footballers
Cork inter-county Gaelic footballers
Munster inter-provincial Gaelic footballers
Winners of one All-Ireland medal (Gaelic football)